Marie Carandini, Marchioness of Sarzano  (born Maria Burgess; 1 February 1826 – 13 April 1894) was an English-Australian opera singer.

Early life
Maria Burgess was born in Brixton, Surrey, the daughter of coachman James Burgess (died 1834) and Martha Burgess ( Medwin). Her mother was a cousin of Thomas Medwin, Byron's companion and biographer, and her father claimed a close relationship to Shelley. She was brought by her parents to Van Diemen's Land (now Tasmania) in 1833. 

At the age of 17, she married an Italian nobleman, Jerome Carandini, the Marquis of Sarzano (1803–1870), who was a political refugee. Her musical training and first performances were in Hobart.

Career
The Carandinis came to Sydney around 1845 and studied under Isaac Nathan, Sara Flower and Lewis Henry Lavenu.

Marie soon established a reputation as a concert singer and operatic prima donna, both in Sydney and Melbourne, and was a popular favourite in many other centres in  Australia. She was frequently billed as "The Australian Jenny Lind". She has the distinction of having been Australia's first Adalgisa in Bellini's opera Norma (1852, Royal Victoria Theatre, Sydney) beside the Norma of Sara Flower. Her husband, having received a pardon from the Italian government, went to Italy in 1870, but died at Modena of gastric fever and inflammation of the lungs soon after his arrival. Madame Carandini continued to sing in concerts for some years in Australia and New Zealand, with visits to the United States and India. In November 1858 Carandini sang Leonora in Verdi's Il trovatore in a twenty-seven performance season at the Princess Theatre, Melbourne. The Carandini troupe performed what may have been New Zealand's first full opera production when they performed Henry Bishop's Guy Mannering at Dunedin's Princess Theatre in September 1862.

Late life and legacy

Carandini's last Australian appearance was in farewell concert on 3 February 1892 at the Melbourne Town Hall; she sang "Jessie the flower of Dumblane" with a strong voice for her age. Soon afterwards she left for England. In her late life, Carandini lived at Richmond Hill, near Bath, with her daughter; she died there on 13 April 1894, aged 68.

Family

Carandini had eight children, of whom five daughters were musical and took part in her tours. Her eldest daughter Rosina Palmer was a notable soprano in Australia.

Her great-grandson (by her daughter, Countess Estelle Marie (née Carandini di Sarzano); (1889–1981)) was actor Sir Christopher Lee and her great-great-granddaughter is Dame Harriet Walter. 

She was also the great-grandmother of the actress Hermione Hannen through her daughter Fanny Ellen Hannah Louisa Carandini, who married Sir Henry Morland.

Tribute

A street in the Canberra suburb of Melba is named in her honour.

References

External links
Marie Carandini at Project Gutenberg Australia

1826 births
1894 deaths
Marie
English emigrants to colonial Australia
English operatic sopranos
People from Brixton
People from Tasmania
Singers from London
Singers from Sydney
Women of the Victorian era
19th-century English musicians